Itty may refer to:

 Itty Achudan, a 17th-century Ayurvedic physician
 Itty E, a United States Navy patrol vessel
 Johncy Itty, former bishop of the Episcopal Diocese of Oregon